Oluseyi Smith or Seyi Smith (born February 21, 1987) is a Nigerian-born Canadian sprinter. He took part in the 2012 Summer Olympics in the 4 × 100 m relay with teammates Jared Connaughton, Gavin Smellie and Justyn Warner. In the final, the Canadian relay team arrived in third place and initially believed they had won bronze but they were disqualified when officials judged that Connaughton had stepped on the lane line just before passing the baton. The relay team from Trinidad and Tobago were awarded the bronze.

References

External links
 

1987 births
Living people
Canadian male sprinters
Olympic track and field athletes of Canada
Athletes (track and field) at the 2012 Summer Olympics
Athletes (track and field) at the 2010 Commonwealth Games
Canadian sportspeople of Nigerian descent
People from Ife
Nigerian emigrants to Canada
Bobsledders at the 2018 Winter Olympics
Olympic bobsledders of Canada
Commonwealth Games competitors for Canada